Matis Louvel (born 19 July 1999 at Mont-Saint-Aignan) is a French cyclist, who currently rides for UCI ProTeam .

Major results

2018
 3rd Overall Valromey Tour
1st Stage 4
 9th La Route des Géants
2019
 1st Stage 4 Ronde de l'Isard
 1st Stage 1 (TTT) Orlen Nations Grand Prix
 3rd Road race, National Under-23 Road Championships
2020
 9th Prueba Villafranca de Ordizia
2021
 1st Vuelta a Castilla y León
 8th Classic Grand Besançon Doubs
 9th Grand Prix de Fourmies
 10th Overall Volta a la Comunitat Valenciana
2022
 1st Druivenkoers Overijse
 3rd Vuelta a Murcia
 3rd Classic Loire Atlantique
 3rd Tour du Doubs
 5th Trofeo Alcúdia – Port d'Alcúdia
 6th Paris–Camembert
 6th Tro-Bro Léon
 8th Paris–Tours
 10th Paris–Chauny

Grand Tour general classification results timeline

References

External links

1999 births
Living people
French male cyclists
People from Mont-Saint-Aignan
Cyclists from Normandy
Sportspeople from Seine-Maritime